The National Tax Service is the tax organization in South Korea and is run under the Ministry of Economy and Finance. The headquarters are in Sejong City.

Whistleblower reward program
Whistleblowers can be eligible for rewards under reward programs simultaneously and that rewards are for 5-20% of the collected proceeds.

References

External links

 
Official website 

Government agencies of South Korea
Taxation in South Korea
Revenue services